Drum is an unincorporated community in the eastern part of Liberty Township in Bollinger County, Missouri, United States. The community was named for the Drum family, who were prominent pioneers. A post office operated between the years 1893–1916.

References 

Unincorporated communities in Bollinger County, Missouri
Cape Girardeau–Jackson metropolitan area
Unincorporated communities in Missouri